= Webster's Microcomputer Buyer's Guide =

1981 book

- Author: Tony Webster
- Genre: Non-fiction
- Publisher: McGraw-Hill
- Publication date: 1981
- ISBN: 978-0-070-68959-6

Webster's Microcomputer Buyer's Guide is a book written by Tony Webster and published in 1981.

== Contents ==
Webster's Microcomputer Buyer's Guide is a book which contains over 300 pages of computer industry information. Both microcomputer producers and sellers of software for specific models are listed. Sales prices of CPUs and peripheral devices and an expected price for a complete installation are given in the book. Photographs of hardware are included.

== Reception ==
Gene Allen reviewed the book for Computer Gaming World, and stated that "if you want or need a rapid education about the microcomputer industry, this book will help you at least know the right questions to ask. That in itself could be worth a great deal."

In their book The Reader's Guide To Microcomputer Books, Michael Petrusha and Ronald Nicita rated the book 90 points of a scale from 10 to 100, and wrote "It is a valuable reference manual crammed with precise, detailed comparisons of most microcomputers" although they also think that "[t]he chapters which precede the actual encyclopedic treatment of the micro market, however, fail to rise to the standards set by the rest".

The newsletter "Library Systems" states "Librarians [...] should consider purchasing a copy of Tony Webster's Microcomputer Buyer's Guide".
